Wat Nong Pah Pong (Generally shortened to: Wat Pah Pong, Thai: วัดหนองป่าพง) is a Theravada Buddhist monastery in Ubon Ratchathani Province, (Amphoe) Warin Chamrap, Thailand. It was established by the late Ajahn Chah as the main monastery of the Thai Forest Tradition.

International Branch Monasteries

In 1975, one of Ajahn Chah's first Western disciples, the Venerable Ajahn Sumedho, opened what was to be the first in a long line of branch monasteries (currently around 240 branches) of Wat Pah Pong specifically geared towards the growing interest in traditional Buddhist practices among Westerners. The Thai monastery Wat Pah Nanachat, along with a growing list of monasteries, opened in recent years around the world, are introducing the heart of the Buddhist teachings to what was previously something of an inaccessible audience to the Thai Forest masters.

Following is an incomplete list of International branch monasteries and associated monasteries of Wat Nong Pah Pong, sorted alphabetically by country:

Australia
Bodhivana Monastery in Victoria
Bodhisaddha Forest Monastery near Sydney (Associated Monastery)
Bodhipāla Monastery near Adelaide (Associated Monastery)
Dhammagiri Forest Monastery near Brisbane, Queensland (Associated Monastery)
Vimokkharam Forest Hermitage near Melbourne, Victoria (Associated Monastery)
Wat Buddha Dhamma in New South Wales, near Sydney (Associated Monastery)
Brazil
 Suddhavāri Monastery in São Lourenço, MG (Associated Monastery)
Canada
Arrow River Forest Hermitage in Thunder Bay, Ontario (Associated Monastery)
Birken Forest Buddhist Monastery in Knutsford, BC (Associated Monastery)
Tisarana Buddhist Monastery in Perth, Ontario
Germany 
Muttodaya Monastery near Nuernberg (Associated Monastery)
Italy
Santacittarama in Rieti
New Zealand
Bodhinyanarama Forest Monastery in Wellington
Vimutti Forest Monastery in Bombay 
Norway 
Lokuttara Vihara (Skiptvet Buddhist Monastery) near Oslo (Associated Monastery)
Portugal 
Sumedharama in Ericeira
Switzerland
Kloster Dhammapala in Kandersteg
Thailand
Wat Pah Nanachat in Ubon Rachathani
United Kingdom
Amaravati Buddhist Monastery in Hertfordshire
Aruna Ratanagiri Buddhist Monastery in Northumberland
Chithurst Buddhist Monastery in Hampshire
The Forest Hermitage in Warwickshire
Hartridge Buddhist Monastery in Devon
United States of America
Abhayagiri Buddhist Monastery in Redwood Valley, California
Pacific Hermitage near Portland Oregon (Associated Monastery)
Temple Forest Monastery (Jetavana) near Boston

Sources
Official homepage (Thai)
Official homepage (English index)
The Forest Sangha
Forest Wisdom
Freely available publications of Ajahn Chah and his disciples in English

Nong Pah Pong